Transmembrane 6 superfamily member 1 is a protein that in humans is encoded by the TM6SF1 gene.

References

Further reading